Nicolás Alexander Lapentti Gómez (born 13 August 1976) is a former professional tennis player from Ecuador. His brothers, Giovanni and Leonardo, uncle Andrés, and cousins Roberto and Emilio also are or were on the pro circuit. His father, also named Nicolás Lapentti, was a star basketball player at the College (now University) of St. Thomas in Minnesota from 1963 to 1967, and played on the Ecuador Olympic team.

Beginnings
Lapentti began playing tennis at the age of six.

He first came to the tennis world's attention an outstanding junior player who won the Orange Bowl in Florida in 1994, when he also captured the junior doubles titles at the French Open (partnering with Gustavo Kuerten) and the US Open.

Professional
Lapentti turned professional in 1995 and won his first top-level singles title later that year at Bogotá.

In 1999, Lapentti was a semi-finalist at the Australian Open, defeating Thomas Johansson, Magnus Norman, Mikael Tillström, Andrew Ilie and Karol Kučera before losing to Thomas Enqvist. He also won two tour singles titles that year and reached his career-high singles ranking of world No. 6 that November.

In 2002, Lapentti won his fifth tour singles title at St. Pölten, beating Fernando Vicente in straight sets in the final. In the second round of that tournament, his rival, Irakli Labadze, faced four match points but was not able to convert any of them. Lapentti finally won that tough match 5–7, 7–6(1), 7–6(6).

His brother, Giovanni, also a professional tennis player, reached a career-high singles ranking of world No. 110 in May 2005. In addition, another brother, Leonardo, has been active at the lower levels of professional tennis.

In the Cincinnati Open 2008, Lapentti defeated David Ferrer in second round, Fernando Verdasco in the third round and faced No. 2 seed Rafael Nadal in the quarterfinals where he lost in straight sets. With that victory over Lapentti, Nadal clinched the world No. 1 ranking for the first time.

In his last participation in a Grand Slam championship, he unfortunately had to retire against Novak Djokovic in the first round of the 2009 French Open.

In 2017, it was announced that Nicolás would compete in the Ecuador Open doubles draw alongside brother Giovanni, playing in the final event of his career.

Davis Cup
He has also been a member of the Ecuador Davis Cup team since 1993. Representing his country in Davis Cup since he was 17, and won the deciding rubber against Great Britain (July 2000) to put Ecuador in the World Group. Moreover, he owns the Davis Cup record for most matches won in five sets, with a total of 13 victories.

Personal
He set up the Nicolás Lapentti Foundation in late 2000 to help bring tennis to the underprivileged, and develop future champions. Other interests include soccer and reading Robert Ludlum books.

ATP career finals

Singles: 12 (5 wins, 7 losses)

Doubles: 7 (3 wins, 4 losses)

Singles performance timeline

Top 10 wins

Notes

References

External links

  
 
 
 

1976 births
Living people
Ecuadorian expatriates in the United States
Ecuadorian male tennis players
Ecuadorian people of Italian descent
Ecuadorian people of Spanish descent
French Open junior champions
Olympic tennis players of Ecuador
Sportspeople from Guayaquil
Tennis players from Miami
Tennis players at the 1996 Summer Olympics
Tennis players at the 2004 Summer Olympics
Tennis players at the 2008 Summer Olympics
US Open (tennis) junior champions
Grand Slam (tennis) champions in boys' doubles